Andrew J. Porter is an American short story writer.

Life
Porter was born in Lancaster, Pennsylvania. He graduated from Vassar College, and the Iowa Writers' Workshop.
Currently, Porter lives in San Antonio, Texas, where he is Professor of English at Trinity University and Director of the Creative Writing Program.

His debut short story collection, The Theory of Light and Matter, won the 2007 Flannery O'Connor Award for Short Fiction and was republished in 2010 by Vintage Books/Random House. He is also the author of the novel In Between Days (Alfred A. Knopf, 2012), which was selected for the Barnes & Noble "Discover Great New Writers" series, and the forthcoming short story collection The Disappeared (Alfred A. Knopf). His short fiction has appeared in publications such as One Story, Ploughshares, The Threepenny Review, The Southern Review, Epoch (magazine), Narrative Magazine,  Prairie Schooner, The Missouri Review,  The Antioch Review,  Alaska Quarterly Review, StoryQuarterly, Colorado Review, Story (magazine) and The Pushcart Prize Anthology. He appeared on NPR's Selected Shorts. His short stories have been awarded a Pushcart Prize and twice selected as a Distinguished Story of the Year by Best American Short Stories. Foreign editions and translations of The Theory of Light and Matter and In Between Days have been published in France, The Netherlands, Korea, Bulgaria, Argentina, Australia and The United Kingdom.

Awards
 2007 Flannery O'Connor Award
 2008 Foreword Magazine Book of the Year Award
 2004 W.K. Rose Fellowship in the Creative Arts from Vassar College
 James Michener-Paul Engle Fellowship from the James Michener/Copernicus Society of America
 2009 Drake Emerging Writer Award from Drake University
 2012 Barnes & Noble Discover Great New Writers Selection
 Iowa Teaching/Writing Fellowship from the University of Iowa
 Tennessee Williams Scholarship from the Sewanee' Writers' Conference
 Residency Fellowship from the Helene Wurlitzer Foundation
 Glenna Luschei Award
 Pushcart Prize
 The 2008 Artist Foundation of San Antonio Literary Arts Award

Works
 The Theory of Light and Matter published in 2008 by the University of Georgia Press. In 2010 it was republished in paperback by Vintage Books/Penguin Random House
 In Between Days published in 2012 by Alfred A. Knopf/Random House
 The Disappeared Alfred A. Knopf (forthcoming)

Further reading
Art at Our Doorstep: San Antonio Writers and Artists featuring Andrew Porter. Edited by Nan Cuba and Riley Robinson (Trinity University Press, 2008).

References
Andrew Porter's Official website
Pushcart Prize reading onSelected Shorts
Trinity University English Department
Profile in San Antonio Express-News
Profile at Houston CultureMap
Profile in Houston Magazine
One Story Page for "Azul"
The Guardian review of In Between Days
Largehearted Boy: Book Notes
The Christian Science Monitor on The Theory of Light and Matter

1972 births
American short story writers
Writers from Lancaster, Pennsylvania
Flannery O'Connor Award for Short Fiction winners
Vassar College alumni
Iowa Writers' Workshop alumni
Living people
Lancaster Country Day School alumni